Thomas Payne (by 1507 – 19 March 1560) was an English politician.

He was a Member (MP) of the Parliament of England for Gloucester in October 1553, April 1554 and 1558.

References

1560 deaths
Members of the Parliament of England (pre-1707) for Gloucester
English MPs 1553 (Mary I)
English MPs 1554
English MPs 1558
Year of birth uncertain